Najiyah bint al-Walid ibn al-Mughira is a sahaba of Muhammad. She is the daughter of  Walid ibn al-Mughira.

Najiyah was one of women who became Muslim before their husbands did. Some of these women were prevented from doing the hijra while their husbands were still non-Muslims.

See also
Sahaba

External links
 Muttaqun.com

Women companions of the Prophet
Banu Makhzum
7th-century Arabs